Phrynobatrachus versicolor is a species of frog in the family Phrynobatrachidae. It is found in northwestern Burundi, western Rwanda, southwestern Uganda, and adjacent eastern Democratic Republic of the Congo. Common names Rwanda river frog and green puddle frog have been coined for it. The specific name versicolor, derived from the Latin versare ("to change") and color, and refers to its variable dorsal colouration.

Description
Males measure  and adult females  in snout–vent length. The body is comparatively stocky and robust. The tympanum is distinct. The finger and toe tips bear discs, but are less developed on the toes. The dorsal colouration is variable. The venter is uniform white, pinkish, or yellowish brown with vermiculation or mottling. A median line may be present and extends from the tip of the lower jaw through the chest area, sometimes beyond.

Habitat and conservation
It is associated particularly with swamps and rivulets where the reproduction takes place. It can be locally common, but the total population is believed to be declining, and it does not occur outside undisturbed habitats. It is threatened by habitat loss caused by agriculture, wood extraction, and expanding human settlements. It occurs in several protected areas: Virunga National Park (Democratic Republic of Congo), Kibale National Park (Uganda), and Bwindi Impenetrable National Park (Uganda).

References

versicolor
Frogs of Africa
Amphibians of Burundi
Amphibians of the Democratic Republic of the Congo
Amphibians of Rwanda
Amphibians of Uganda
Taxa named by Ernst Ahl
Amphibians described in 1924
Taxonomy articles created by Polbot